Resco spol. s r.o. is an IT company with headquarters in Bratislava, Slovakia that was founded in 1999 by Radomir Vozar, Eduard Kirchner and Marcel Saffa. As of 2014 the company has grown its customer base up to more than million users and 4000 corporations.
Resco stands for REmote Solutions COmpany.

History and development

In its beginnings, team of Resco developers focused on platforms such as Palm OS, Pocket Pc (Standard) and Pocket PC (Professional) known today as Windows Mobile. Blackberry’s RIM OS was not yet included. Applications included Resco Explorer, Resco Photo Viewer, Resco Radio and Resco Audio Recorder, which received awards from PDA journals such as Pocket PC Magazine. In 2004 Resco published their first application for Nokia’s Symbian OS (Resco Photo Viewer for Symbian 6.1), and last version of it released in 2010 (Photo Viewer 6.0 for Symbian 9.x).
The genesis and growing popularity of new mobile platforms in 2009 and 2010 has become a motivation for Resco to completely change the company's heading and strategy. The development on four former mobile platforms was stopped and at the end of the year 2010 Resco introduced their first application for Android and Windows Phone 7 (Resco Radio).

In 2009, a completely new path towards business applications was taken. Resco disrupted the world of Mobile CRM with the first version of Resco Mobile CRM, a client for Dynamics CRM. Resco Mobile CRM continuously receives new features  plus an extra supplement: a customization tool Woodford, which is making the solution accessible to a wider range of users. In 2013, Resco.net, Inc. — the US subsidiary of Resco was launched
, the same time a new product: Resco Advantage (later renamed to Resco CRM) was introduced to the world as a brand new, standalone Mobile CRM solution. With the coming years, enterprise mobility became the trending force enabling companies and their employees to be more mobile on-the-go. With this growing market trend, Resco launched its newest product lines, Resco Inspections, Resco Mobile Sales, Resco Field Service, Route Planner, Resco Platform, and City Smart Services.

In July 2019, Miro Pomsar became the CEO, taking over from Radomir Vozar, one of the founders. 

In May 2022, Andrew Lorraine became the CEO.

First products

Resco Explorer worked as a file explorer, task manager, network browser, ftp explorer, zipper and viewer with limited support for social networks. The first version was released in 2001. 

Photo Manager was the company's second application first released in 2003. 

Resco Radio was released in 2006.

Resco Keyboard Pro was the application for all the companies whose employers were using Windows Mobile devices for work.

Resco's Mobile games were created in 2002. Several games such as logic crossword game Resco WordGame, a fusion of soccer and snooker Resco xBall and more brought to users by Resco.

Recent products 
Resco Inspections operates to create comprehensive dynamic questionnaires and forms with entirely customized design and business logic to drive each inspection. It has four components, Designer, Scheduler, Inspector App, Analyst. The first official version was released in 2019.

Resco Mobile Sales works as a mobile CRM app to house important sales data for sales representatives. It has integration components with Microsoft Dynamics 365, Salesforce, many 3rd party companies. It was made available in 2009 with Resco Mobile CRM.

Resco Field Service operates as a mobile app enabling field service teams to schedule, plan routes, and log information on job sites.

Route Planner by Resco is a mobile app that enables users to plan routes, and keep track of employees' work progress that are in the field.

Resco Platform is a Mobile Application Development Platform (MADP) that works to enable users to build applications from scratch. Resco's platform was recognized in Gartner's Magic Quadrant 2018.

City Smart Services provides a cloud-based CRM environment and offline cross-platform apps designed specifically for municipalities, councils and governments, together with mobile apps created for residents and contractors/service technicians.

See also 
 Mobile application development
 .NET Compact Framework
 .NET Compact Framework controls
 Mono (software)

References 

Software companies of Slovakia
Slovak brands
Companies based in Bratislava
Software companies established in 1999
Customer relationship management software companies
Slovakian companies established in 1999